Western Dani, or Laani, is the most populous Papuan language in Indonesian New Guinea. It is spoken by the Lani people in the province of Papua. The Swart Valley tribes are called Oeringoep and Timorini in literature from the 1920s, but those names are no longer used.

Phonology
The phonology of the Western Dani language:

At the beginning of words, stops sound aspirated.

Vowels /i, u, ɒ/ have allophones, [, ].

References

Dani languages
Languages of western New Guinea